Havoc Motorcycles is a Canadian company that manufactures heavyweight street motorcycles.  It is notable as the only motorcycle manufacturer registered with Transport Canada in Atlantic Canada, and one of only four Canadian-owned and operated motorcycle manufacturers.  The others are BRP-Bombardier Recreational Products (Quebec), Lito Motorcycles (Quebec), and Thug Cycles (Alberta).

History 
Havoc Motorcycles was founded in Prince Edward Island in 2014. The company's launch was announced in September 2015 with the launch of its first prototype model, the "Iron Flight: Mike Tyson Special Edition" a themed motorcycle featuring graphics licensed from Mike Tyson, entertainer and former heavyweight boxing champion. 

In 2016, Havoc Motorcycles formed a partnership with the Wild West Motor Co., an established United States manufacturer of hand-built motorcycles in operation since 1987, for technology transfer and licensing of high-horsepower street motorcycle designs. The Wild West Gunfire, a dragster-inspired motorcycle, formed the basis for two of Havoc Motorcycles' next models, and companies cooperated in the launch of the Havoc 124SS that was unveiled in February 2017.

In 2019 the company introduced the Havoc 127 VooDoo, a cruiser with 1960s retro styling.

References

External links

Motorcycle manufacturers of Canada
Vehicle manufacturing companies established in 2014
2014 establishments in Canada